Utolineides is a genus of nemerteans belonging to the family Lineidae.

Species:

Utolineides alba 
Utolineides kenneli

References

Lineidae
Nemertea genera